William Slack (20 January 1906 – 9 August 1989) was an English professional footballer who played as an outside forward. Born in Skegby, he began his career in non-league football before joining Blackpool in 1927. Slack went on to play for several other Football League teams, including Nelson, Norwich City and Mansfield Town.

Biography
William Slack was born in the village of Skegby, Nottinghamshire, on 20 January 1906. He served in the British Army and was a soldier in the Western Command. After his football career ended, he returned to live in Skegby and died there on 9 August 1989, at the age of 83.

Football career
Slack began his career at Sutton Junction before moving on to Shirebrook in January 1927. After returning for a short spell at Sutton Junction later in the year, Slack was signed by Football League Second Division side Blackpool for a transfer fee of £125. With two months of the 1927–28 season remaining, he joined Nelson of the Third Division North on short-term contract. He scored a volleyed goal on his debut for the club in the 5–4 win away at Hartlepools United on 17 March 1928. Slack played the next three matches, before spending two games out of the team in place of Harold Taylor. He returned to the side for the match against Ashington on 14 April 1928, and scored his second goal for Nelson in a 1–5 defeat. Slack made a further five appearances for the East Lancashire outfit, but was released at the end of the season after the club finished bottom of the league.

After departing Nelson, Slack had spent a season with Portsmouth but failed to make a first-team appearance for the club. In June 1929, he joined Football League Third Division South side Merthyr Town but he could not prevent the team finishing bottom of the league and failing re-election, the defence having conceded a total of 135 goals during the campaign. Slack subsequently signed for fellow Third Division South outfit Norwich City. He spent two seasons with the Norfolk club, before moving to Mansfield Town in August 1932. Mansfield proved to be his last professional club, as he played at Field Mill for four years before joining non-league Sutton Town. Slack retired from football at the end of the 1936–37 season, following a short spell with Ripley Town.

References

1906 births
1989 deaths
People from Ashfield District
Footballers from Nottinghamshire
English footballers
Association football forwards
Sutton Junction F.C. players
Shirebrook Miners Welfare F.C. players
Blackpool F.C. players
Nelson F.C. players
Portsmouth F.C. players
Merthyr Town F.C. players
Norwich City F.C. players
Mansfield Town F.C. players
Sutton Town A.F.C. players
Ripley Town F.C. players
English Football League players
20th-century British Army personnel
British Army soldiers
Military personnel from Nottinghamshire